This is a list of Croatian television related events from 1957.

Events

Debuts

Television shows

Ending this year

Births
19 July - Darko Janeš, actor

Deaths